The First Battle of Cannanore was a naval engagement between the Third Portuguese Armada under João da Nova and the naval forces of Calicut, which had been assembled by the Zamorin against the Portuguese in order to prevent their return to Portugal.

The battle was fought over two days, between 31 December 1501 and 2 January 1502, and was the first major Portuguese naval engagement in the Indian Ocean. Although badly outnumbered, da Nova's bold tactics, better trained and prepared men, and superior weaponry proved decisive for the Portuguese to defeat the blocking force of Calicut, break out of Cannanore, and emerge victorious from the battle.

The battle is also historically notable for being one of the earliest recorded deliberate uses of a naval line of battle, and for resolving the battle by cannon alone. These tactics would become increasingly prevalent as navies evolved and began to see ships less as carriers of armed men, and more as floating artillery. In that respect, this has been called the first 'modern' naval battle (at least for one side). After it, João da Nova returned to Portugal.

References

Cannanore
Cannanore
1501 in India
1502 in India
Cannanore